Peter Bolesław Schmeichel  (born 18 November 1963) is a Danish former professional footballer who played as a goalkeeper. During eight seasons at English club Manchester United, he captained the club to victory in the 1999 UEFA Champions League Final to complete the Treble. He also won the UEFA Euro 1992 with his country Denmark.

A fierce competitor, he often loudly criticised perceived mistakes by his defenders. Unusually for a goalkeeper, he scored 11 goals during his career, including one for the national team. He is also the most capped player for the Denmark national team, with 129 games between 1987 and 2001. In addition to Euro 92, he played for his country at the 1998 FIFA World Cup and three additional European Championship tournaments. He captained the national team in 30 matches. He also represented Gladsaxe-Hero, Hvidovre, Brøndby, Sporting CP, Aston Villa and Manchester City in a career that lasted from 1981 until 2003 and yielded 24 trophies.

Regarded as one of the greatest goalkeepers of all time, he was voted the IFFHS World's Best Goalkeeper in 1992 and 1993, the International Federation of Football History & Statistics also ranked Schmeichel among the top 10 goalkeepers of the 20th century. In 2001, Schmeichel won a public poll held by Reuters, in which the majority of the 200,000 participants voted him as the best goalkeeper ever, ahead of Lev Yashin and Gordon Banks. In 2003, Schmeichel was inducted into the English Football Hall of Fame in recognition of his impact on the English game. In March 2004, he was named as one of the "125 greatest living footballers", at the FIFA 100 celebrations. Schmeichel's son, Kasper, is also a professional goalkeeper, currently playing for Ligue 1 side OGC Nice and the Denmark national team.

Early life
Schmeichel was born in the Søborggård parish of Gladsaxe, Denmark, to Inger, a Danish nurse, and Antoni "Tolek" Schmeichel, a Polish jazz musician. He held Polish citizenship until November 1971 when he, his father, and his three sisters became Danish citizens.

Schmeichel inherited his middle name – Bolesław – from his great-grandfather. He spent his early years in the town of Buddinge, Copenhagen, and began his football career playing for a team in the adjacent suburb of Høje-Gladsaxe. His first match came on 7 August 1972 at the age of 8. After a two-and-a-half-year unbeaten run, Schmeichel was approached by BK Hero, a team from a few divisions above Høje-Gladsaxe and with one of the largest youth football schemes in Denmark. BK Hero merged with Gladsaxe BK in 1979 to form Gladsaxe-Hero BK, and Schmeichel was presented with the opportunity to play for the Zealand FA's junior representative team.

Before becoming a professional footballer, Schmeichel had to work a number of jobs to make ends meet. His first job came in the dyeing department of a textile factory, but safety concerns led to his resignation. He then spent 12 months as a cleaner at an old people's home, before taking up an office job with the World Wildlife Fund. He originally worked in the organisation's shops, but three weeks after he joined, the store manager left and Schmeichel was promoted to the position of sales manager. Soon after, Schmeichel was called upon to do his four weeks of compulsory military service. However, this coincided with Hvidovre's summer training camp in Portugal, which he was permitted to go on with the proviso that he completed his military service the following month. Nevertheless, the delicate organisational situation that arose between the WWF, the Danish defence department and Hvidovre prompted Schmeichel to give up working for the WWF. A job with his father-in-law's flooring firm came next, until he realised that his knees could not support his  frame for eight hours a day, and he was offered a job with the advertising firm owned by Hvidovre's chairman, Niels Erik Madsen. This was to be his last job outside football, as he was offered a contract with Brøndby the following spring.

Club career

Early career
Eventually graduating to the Gladsaxe-Hero senior squad, Schmeichel met his first mentor in Svend Aage Hansen, the first team coach at the club, and later to become his father-in-law. With Gladsaxe-Hero already relegated from the Danish Third Division with three games to go, Hansen promoted Schmeichel and six others from the youth team for a match against IF Skjold Birkerød. The team lost 1–0, but Schmeichel received mentions in local newspapers for his personal performance. At the end of the season, Hansen explained to Schmeichel his plan for the future, which involved Schmeichel spending two more seasons with Gladsaxe-Hero BK before moving on to Hvidovre, playing for the Danish national team, and eventually having a successful career abroad. Schmeichel admits that he had received an offer to play for B 1903's youth team, but he turned it down as the club "seemed a bit boring".

The following season, Gladsaxe-Hero needed only to avoid defeat to Stubbekøbing to prevent relegation from the Danish National League. In the end, Schmeichel played one of the best games of his career and Gladsaxe-Hero won the match. At the end of the game, Hansen's daughter, Bente, ran onto the pitch and hugged Schmeichel. The two ended up going out as a couple, and they eventually got married.

Despite having the fifth best defence in the league, conceding 40 goals in 30 games, Schmeichel and Hvidovre finished in 14th place and were relegated in 1985. After only a single season, the club bounced right back to the 1st Division, but Schmeichel left the club to join Brøndby.

Brøndby
Before the 1987 season, Schmeichel joined Brøndby, who finished as runners-up the previous season. In the five seasons that Schmeichel played with Brøndby, they went on to win the 1st Division four times. The climax of his Brøndby career would come in the 1990–91 UEFA Cup, which saw Schmeichel as an important part of the team that reached the semi-finals, keeping seven clean sheets in the competition. The club was eliminated from the tournament following a 2–1 away defeat to Roma with a last-minute goal by Rudi Völler. Schmeichel was voted 10th in "The World's Best Goalkeeper 1991" poll by the IFFHS.

Manchester United

Following his showings on the international scene, Manchester United signed Schmeichel on 6 August 1991 for £505,000, a price described in 2000 by Manchester United manager Alex Ferguson as the "bargain of the century." Schmeichel was virtually unknown outside Denmark at the time, especially within the United squad members. Manchester United finished as runners-up in Schmeichel's first season. and they also won the Football League Cup for the first time in the club's history. For his performances throughout the season, he was elected "The World's Best Goalkeeper of 1992" by IFFHS.

In the 1992–93 season, 22 clean sheets from Schmeichel helped United win the Premier League championship, the first time the club had won England's top trophy in 26 years. Schmeichel was once again named "The World's Best Goalkeeper" in 1993. In January 1994, Schmeichel fell out with Ferguson, as United had squandered a 3–0 lead to draw 3–3 with Liverpool. The two had a row where Schmeichel "said the most horrible things", and Ferguson considered selling him as a result. A few days later, Schmeichel apologised to his teammates for losing his temper. Ferguson overheard, and decided to retain Schmeichel. Schmeichel and United repeated the Premier League championship win at the end of the season, also capturing the FA Cup. United were denied a domestic treble by losing the 1994 League Cup Final to Aston Villa, a game for which Schmeichel was suspended.

Following a match against Arsenal in November 1996, Schmeichel was accused of racism by Ian Wright. During the game, Schmeichel and Wright had a number of controversies, and at the end of the game, the two players confronted each other on their way off the pitch. After the game, news emerged of a police inquiry into the incident, where it was alleged that Schmeichel had made a racist remark. In March 1997, the Crown Prosecution Service decided not to press any charges.

Schmeichel ended his Manchester United career on a high note, when the club won the Treble (the FA Premier League title, FA Cup and UEFA Champions League in the same season). In that year's FA Cup semi-final against Arsenal, Schmeichel saved a penalty kick by Dennis Bergkamp in the last minutes of the game (which Schmeichel revealed he was unaware of time), to send the game into extra time. In the absence of the suspended Roy Keane, he captained United in the UEFA Champions League final in May 1999. German opponents Bayern Munich had a 1–0 lead until the dying minutes of the game, when United received a corner kick. Schmeichel ran into the attack attempting to cause confusion, and Teddy Sheringham scored the equalising goal. A few seconds later, Ole Gunnar Solskjær scored the winner for United to ensure that Schmeichel's United career ended with a trophy win. Schmeichel cartwheeled gleefully in his area after Solskjær's winning goal.

With his departure, Manchester United had trouble finding a replacement for him, going through several high-profile goalkeepers including Mark Bosnich, Massimo Taibi, Fabien Barthez, Tim Howard and Roy Carroll, before finally buying Edwin van der Sar, who Sir Alex Ferguson considered the best goalkeeper to have played for the club since Schmeichel.

Sporting CP
Schmeichel decided to leave English football at the end of the 1998–99 season, as the gruelling 60-game season, which came with playing with a successful club, was threatening to undermine his high standards at the age of 36. Seeking a slower pace of football, he moved to Sporting CP, where he signed a two-year contract. In his first season with the club, he won the 1999–2000 Primeira Liga title, putting an end to the team's 18 years without a championship. At the end of the 1999–2000 season, Schmeichel and Sporting CP agreed to terminate his contract with a free transfer back to Manchester United verbally agreed. However, Sir Alex Ferguson called the deal off due to turning an eye to the "future", Fabien Barthez. The contract issue with Sporting CP was quickly resolved and he continued for a second season in Portugal.

His second year with Sporting was the first time in 14 years, since his Hvidovre days, that Schmeichel's club had finished below second place in the league. Schmeichel stated his wish to activate a contract option of a further year at Sporting in January 2001, but eventually decided to leave the club when his contract expired in June 2001.

Aston Villa
Schmeichel returned to England with Aston Villa in July 2001, signing a one-year contract with the option to extend it by a further year. On 20 October 2001, Schmeichel became the first goalkeeper to score a Premier League goal, in a 3–2 defeat away to Everton; this feat has been repeated just five times since: by Blackburn Rovers' Brad Friedel on 21 February 2004, also from a corner kick; by Tottenham Hotspur's Paul Robinson from a free-kick on 17 March 2007; by Everton's Tim Howard on 4 January 2012; by Stoke City's Asmir Begović on 2 November 2013; and by Liverpool's Alisson Becker on 16 May 2021. Schmeichel left Aston Villa after one season after he fell behind Peter Enckelman in the club's pecking order under new manager Graham Taylor, who had replaced John Gregory in February 2002.

Manchester City
In 2002, Schmeichel moved to Manchester City on a free transfer. He played only one season, in 2002–03. In the Manchester derby, he was never on the losing side; during his nine years with Manchester United, they were unbeaten against Manchester City, while in his single season with City, they won at Maine Road and drew at Old Trafford. Schmeichel announced his retirement from football in April 2003.

International career

Schmeichel made his debut for the Denmark national football team in May 1987, under national manager Sepp Piontek, and was selected for UEFA Euro 1988, where he eventually became Denmark's starting goalkeeper, after initially serving as a back-up to Troels Rasmussen in Denmark's opening 3–2 defeat to Spain; Denmark lost both of their remaining two matches 2–0 to West Germany and Italy, however, and were eliminated in the first round of the competition.

Under new national manager Richard Møller Nielsen, Schmeichel was Denmark's starting goalkeeper at the Euro 92 tournament which they went on to win. Although Denmark initially finished behind Yugoslavia in their qualification campaign for the final tournament, the latter nation were banned from the competition, while Denmark replaced them in the finals. Schmeichel made a string of important saves during the tournament, keeping a clean sheet in Denmark's opening 0–0 draw against England, and producing decisive stops against Eric Cantona and Jean-Pierre Papin in a 2–1 win over France to advance to the last four. In the semi-finals against defending champions the Netherlands, following a 2–2 draw after extra time, he stopped a penalty kick from Marco van Basten – the only miss of the shoot-out – which enabled Denmark to advance to the final in a 5–4 shootout victory. Schmeichel also made several decisive saves in the final, and even held a cross with one hand, keeping a clean sheet in his nation's 2–0 victory over Germany.

In November 1993, Schmeichel and Denmark failed to qualify for the 1994 FIFA World Cup, as they were tied on points and goal difference with the Republic of Ireland, and went out on goals scored. Schmeichel played for Denmark at Euro 96, hosted by England. The defending European Champions went out in the preliminary group stage, despite delivering results equivalent to the Euro 92 tournament in the first round. Under national manager Bo Johansson, Schmeichel was a part of the Danish squad at the 1998 FIFA World Cup. He was one of the leading members of the Danish campaign, which ended in a 3–2 quarter-final defeat to Brazil.

He scored his only goal for the Danish national team, a penalty kick in a 2–2 draw against Belgium, in a June 2000 warm-up match for Euro 2000. He represented Denmark at Euro 2000, where the team was eliminated in the group stage. He announced his retirement from the national team in February 2001, and played his final match (his 129th international appearance) two months later, captaining the side in a 3–0 friendly win over Slovenia at Copenhagen's Parken Stadium; he was substituted in the 65th minute to a standing ovation, replaced by long-time back-up Peter Kjær. He kept a clean sheet in the match.

Style of play
Schmeichel is widely regarded by pundits, as well as both former and current goalkeeping colleagues, as one of the greatest goalkeepers of all time, and also as Denmark's greatest goalkeeper ever, and has been described as a modern, talented, world-class, and complete goalkeeper, who also stood out for the longevity of his career. A tall, strong and physically imposing goalkeeper, with a large frame and long reach, as well as excellent reflexes, he was also extremely athletic and agile for a player of his size, and was known for his ability to cover the goal with his trademark "star jump" saves, a technique he reportedly developed from playing handball.

He was highly regarded for his goalkeeping technique, shot-stopping ability, and positioning between the posts, as well as his command of his area, handling, and ability to rush off his line both in one on one situations or when coming out to claim crosses. A courageous and fierce competitor, he was a vocal presence in goal, known for his strong character, mentality, ability to organise his defence, and leadership from the back, as well as for his criticism of his defenders whenever they made mistakes. He was also effective at stopping penalties. In addition to his goalkeeping ability, he was also known for his capacity to read the game, as well as his adeptness with the ball at his feet, and his distribution and ability to launch swift counter-attacks with his long and accurate throws and kicks. Unusually for a goalkeeper, he would often go up for corner kicks in the opposition's area when his team were trailing, and scored 11 goals in his career. An example of this was when he was playing for Manchester United in a UEFA Cup match against Rotor Volgograd at Old Trafford in September 1995. He scored in the last minutes of the game to tie the match 2–2, though United were eliminated from the tournament on the away goals rule.

Later career
In December 1999, Schmeichel became the owner of his childhood club Hvidovre IF, but withdrew from the club in June 2002.

Schmeichel worked as a pundit for the BBC after retiring, being a regular analyst on Match of the Day until 2005. He then began hosting live UEFA Champions League matches on Danish television channel TV3+, with Preben Elkjær and Brian Laudrup the studio pundits. However, he still works occasionally as a pundit for the BBC.

He also took part in Soccer Aid, and played for the Rest of the World team, who lost 2–1 after he was substituted at half-time. Schmeichel was a contestant on the 2006 series of the BBC's popular Saturday night TV programme Strictly Come Dancing, but was voted out by the public on his 43rd birthday. He also appeared on The Weakest Link in the UK, but he was voted off as the weakest link in the first round.

On 31 August 2007, an investor group including Schmeichel announced their intention to invest DKK 250 million (€33.5 million) in the football club Brøndby IF and make him sports director. This was announced in a press conference in Danish at a hotel in Copenhagen. The offer fell through when Brøndby failed to accept the offer within the group's deadline.

In February 2007, he became the host in a new quiz, on TV3 named 1 mod 100 (the Danish version of 1 vs. 100). In 2008, he became the host of the European version of the Discovery Channel programme, Dirty Jobs.

Personal life
Schmeichel was divorced from his wife Bente Schmeichel in 2013. He remarried again in 2019 to Playboy model Laura Von Lindholm. 

Bente Schmeichel is the mother of his two children, Cecile Schmeichel and Kasper Schmeichel, a professional footballer who plays goalkeeper for the Ligue 1 team Nice and for the Denmark national team since 2013.

Criticism of sportswashing and FIFA support
In 2018, Schmeichel hosted a series of programmes produced by the state-owned Russian television station RT. They took the form of a mixture of football and travel reports, on the occasion of the World Cup in football in the country. He has been criticised for participating in sportswashing, by receiving money to promote Vladimir Putin's Russia and the desert state of Qatar. In addition, he is a supporter of an unpopular FIFA proposal that the World Cup be held every two years.

Career statistics

Club

International

Score and result list Denmark's goal tally first, score column indicates score after Schmeichel goal.

Honours
Source:

Brøndby 
 Danish 1st Division/Danish Superliga: 1987, 1988, 1990, 1991
 Danish Cup: 1988–89

Manchester United 
 Premier League: 1992–93, 1993–94, 1995–96, 1996–97, 1998–99
 FA Cup: 1993–94, 1995–96, 1998–99
 Football League Cup: 1991–92
 FA Charity Shield: 1993, 1994, 1996, 1997
 UEFA Champions League: 1998–99
 European Super Cup: 1991

Sporting CP 
 : 1999–2000
 : 2000

Aston Villa 
 UEFA Intertoto Cup: 2001

Denmark 
 UEFA European Championship: 1992

Individual

 Honorary Member of the Order of the British Empire (MBE): 2001
  (Goalkeeper of the Year in the Danish League): 1987, 1988, 1990, 1992
 Danish Football Player of the Year: 1990, 1993, 1999
 UEFA European Championship Team of the Tournament: 1992
 UEFA Goalkeeper of the Year: 1992, 1993, 1998
 IFFHS World's Best Goalkeeper: 1992, 1993
 PFA Team of the Year: 1992–93 Premier League
 Premier League Player of the Season: 1995–96
 UEFA Club Goalkeeper of the Year: 1997–98
 UEFA Champions League 10 Seasons Dream Team (1992 to 2002): 2002
 English Football Hall of Fame: 2003
 PFA England League Team of the Century (1907 to 2007): 2007
Most clean sheets in the Premier League: 1994–95, 1995–96, 1997–98 
 Premier League Hall of Fame: 2022
 Premier League 10 Seasons Awards (1992–93 to 2001–02):
 Overseas and overall Team of the Decade
 Save of the Decade (vs. Newcastle, 21 December 1997)
 Premier League 20 Seasons Awards (1992–93 to 2011–12):
 Fantasy Teams of the 20 Seasons public and panel choice
 FIFA 100
 Danish Football Hall of Fame
 World Soccer: The 100 Greatest Footballers of All Time
 Football League 100 Legends

Published works

See also
 List of men's footballers with 100 or more international caps

Notes

References

External links
 
 Danish national team profile 
 
 
 Premier League profile
 
 

1963 births
Living people
Danish people of Polish descent
People from Gladsaxe Municipality
Naturalised citizens of Denmark
Danish men's footballers
Association football goalkeepers
Hvidovre IF players
Brøndby IF players
Manchester United F.C. players
Sporting CP footballers
Aston Villa F.C. players
Manchester City F.C. players
Danish 1st Division players
Danish 2nd Division players
Danish Superliga players
English Football League players
Premier League players
Primeira Liga players
UEFA Champions League winning players
English Football Hall of Fame inductees
Denmark under-21 international footballers
Denmark international footballers
UEFA Euro 1988 players
UEFA Euro 1992 players
UEFA Euro 1996 players
1998 FIFA World Cup players
UEFA Euro 2000 players
UEFA European Championship-winning players
FIFA Century Club
FIFA 100
Danish expatriate men's footballers
Danish expatriate sportspeople in England
Danish expatriate sportspeople in Portugal
Expatriate footballers in England
Expatriate footballers in Portugal
Danish television presenters
Honorary Members of the Order of the British Empire
FA Cup Final players
Premier League Hall of Fame inductees
Schmeichel family
Sportspeople from the Capital Region of Denmark